Eugene F. Lester was an American attorney and judge known as Chief Justice of the Oklahoma (US) Supreme Court from 1931 to 1932.

Early life
Eugene F. Lester was born August 7, 1871, in Lebanon, Tennessee to Preston S. and Elizabeth (née Crutchfield). He became an attorney, moved to Oklahoma and became judge of the 5th Judicial District from 1918 to 1924. In 1924, he was named to the Oklahoma Supreme Court, where he served until 1931.  He also served as chief justice of the Supreme Court from 1931 to 1932. He was a member of the Disciples of Christ church, Free Masons and Odd Fellows.

While serving as Chief Justice, Lester represented Oklahoma in a University of North Carolina study that examined the practices of six state supreme courts in trying to be more efficient by sitting in divisions rather than en banc while hearing cases.

Death
A brief notice in the Emporia Gazette in Emporia, Kansas, stated that Lester's body was found in an Oklahoma City hotel room with a bullet wound to the head. A note in the room indicated that he took his own life on July 25, 1940, because of ill health. The acting coroner ruled the death a suicide and gave no other details.

His daughter, Doris Lester Burns, survived him. She died in Pittsburgh, Pennsylvania, at the age of 86, on September 24, 1993, where she had lived for many years. Both her husband, Chester Parker Burns, and her mother, Beulah Collier Lester, had preceded her in death.

Notes

References 

1871 births
1940 deaths
People from Lebanon, Tennessee
People from Latimer County, Oklahoma
People from Oklahoma City
Lawyers from Oklahoma City
Justices of the Oklahoma Supreme Court
U.S. state supreme court judges admitted to the practice of law by reading law
American politicians who committed suicide